Father Brown is a cosy mystery detective period comedy drama television series loosely based on the Father Brown short stories by G. K. Chesterton, starring Mark Williams as the crime-solving Roman Catholic priest. Broadcast began on BBC One on 14 January 2013. The tenth series premiered on BBC One in January 2023.

Synopsis
The series is set in England during the early 1950s. Father Brown is the priest at St Mary's Catholic Church in the fictional village of Kembleford, located in the Cotswolds. Britain is struggling with the aftermath of World War II. Rationing is still in effect. The Coronation of Queen Elizabeth II took place. The death penalty has not yet been abolished, and homosexuality and abortion are still illegal. An empathetic man of keen intelligence, Father Brown solves murder cases when members of his parish are involved, when circumstances are strange enough to gain his interest, or when he's directly asked for help. During his investigations, he occasionally neglects his more mundane parish duties.

He is often helped by the parish secretary, Bridgette McCarthy (Series 1-9), and his housekeeper, Susie Jasinski (Series 1 only). He is also sometimes aided by socialite Lady Felicia Montague; her driver, Sid Carter (a former criminal); and her niece, Bunty Windermere. In series 10, he is aided by Isabel Devine, his new parish secretary, and Brenda Palmer, his housekeeper.

Father Brown's interest in local cases and his habit of offering advice and pointing out clues often annoy the local police inspector. Father Brown holds no animosity towards the police, but he often embarrasses them with his investigations.

During World War I, Father Brown served in the British Army. His experiences as a veteran, along with his vocation as a priest, give him great insight into human nature as well as a desire to offer forgiveness and redemption, wishing to serve his concept of justice rather than strictly following the letter of the law and condemning the guilty. Father Brown is obedient to the Seal of confession in the Catholic Church. When confronting criminals, he sometimes offers to hear their explanations and confessions without judgment. While he then urges them to admit their crimes to the authorities and accept responsibility, he also promises he won't reveal their actions or prevent their escape if they choose otherwise.

Characters
 Father Brown – Mark Williams (2013–present): a slightly rumpled, shambolic, and mild-mannered Roman Catholic priest who, by appearance, is easily forgotten. His apparent innocence belies a playful wit and a razor-sharp intellect. His greatest strength, both as a priest and as a detective of crime, is his love and understanding of other people. He's not there to judge but to save souls. He is a veteran of both World War I and World War II, having served with the Gloucestershire Regiment in both wars (as an infantryman in the first war and as a Catholic chaplain in the second).
 Mrs. Bridgette McCarthy née Maguire – Sorcha Cusack (2013–2022): the Irish parish secretary at St Mary's. She checks the facts for Father Brown, acts as his confidante on official Church business and everything else, is steadfastly loyal to Father Brown, and defends him from the ire of the congregation; she also makes sure he eats. She has a tendency to brag about her award-winning strawberry scones. Mrs. McCarthy is a frequent gossip – though claims she is not – and shares a love/hate relationship with Lady Felicia, although both women eventually admit to being close friends. She is married but leaves her husband after he returns from having lived with another woman following the war. Mrs. McCarthy is no longer Father Brown's parish secretary as she has left Kembleford and returned to Ireland to live closer to her sister.
 Lady Felicia Montague née Windermere – Nancy Carroll (2013–2016 as a lead character): a glamorous but bored socialite who comes from an old and noble recusant family. She is also known as the Countess of Montague by virtue of her marriage to the Earl of Montague, who she calls "Monty". She supports many local charitable activities and resides at a grand stately home named Montague Hall. Lady Felicia is unhappy with her husband's aloofness toward her and has a roving eye when her husband is away, which he usually is. She is a staunch ally of Father Brown and frequent nemesis of Mrs. McCarthy, despite grudging respect between the women. Although she left at the start of series 5 when her husband was appointed Governor of Northern Rhodesia, she made guest appearances in series 6 (The Face of the Enemy), in series 7 in two episodes (The Great Train Robbery and The Honourable Thief), and in series 8 (The Celestial Choir).
 Sidney "Sid" Carter – Alex Price (2013–2016, 2022 as a lead character): An artful dodger, Sid is an occasional black marketeer, part-time crook and informant who becomes Lady Felicia's chauffeur. Father Brown makes him the church handyman while trying to keep him on the straight and narrow. He has a unique talent for being able to talk his way into any situation in order to help Father Brown search for the truth. During his time in Kembleford, he manages to gain the trust and respect of both Father Brown and Mrs. McCarthy, who come to value him as a close friend. Indeed, in series 5 episode The Sins of Others, Father Brown says that he is the closest thing he has ever had to a son. He is also known to share a close bond with The Honourable Penelope "Bunty" Windermere. Father Brown often relies on Sid's skills and links to the criminal underworld of Kembleford to help him solve a case. Originally a regular character, he often makes guest appearances notably in series 5, The Sins of Others, 2016 Christmas Special, The Tree of Truth, series 6, The Face of the Enemy and series 8, The River Corrupted. In series 9. he returned as a lead character.
 Zuzanna "Susie" Jasinski – Kasia Koleczek (2013): Father Brown's part-time housekeeper, who lives in a nearby post-war Polish resettlement camp. Her true first name was revealed in the episode The Eye of Apollo.
 The Honourable Penelope "Bunty" Windermere – Emer Kenny (2017–2020 as a lead character): the wayward niece of Lady Felicia (the daughter of her brother Viscount Windermere) seeking refuge after being photographed leaving a sleazy nightclub with a married man and cited in divorce proceedings. She has had to adapt to life in Kembleford and has become a close friend of both Father Brown and Mrs McCarthy, who she often refers to as simply 'Mrs. M'. It becomes apparent throughout the series that both women share a mutual respect for one another despite often being at odds with each other.
 Inspector/Chief Inspector Walter Valentine – Hugo Speer (2013–2014): head of the local police force who finds himself constantly torn between secret admiration for Father Brown and deep frustration with him. He would like to collaborate but has been burnt once too often by Brown's unorthodox moral code. Nevertheless, he comes to respect his methods and even admits when he is promoted to Detective Chief Inspector and moved to London that he might miss Father Brown. Valentine returns in the final episode of series 8, The Tower of Lost Souls
 Inspector/Chief Inspector Edgar Sullivan – Tom Chambers (2014–2015 2023-): replaced Inspector Valentine at the start of the second series. Sullivan too is exasperated by Father Brown's meddling but is eventually won over. He made a guest appearance as a Special Branch officer in series 7, The Sacrifice of Tantalus under the alias of Inspector Truman. He also appears in the final episode of series 8, The Tower of Lost Souls, having been promoted to Chief Inspector. He returns as a regular in Series 10.
 Inspector Gerald "Jerry" Mallory – Jack Deam (2016–2022): replaces Inspector Sullivan. Like his predecessors, he is often exasperated by Father Brown, whom he sarcastically refers to as "Padre". However, he is a far more open-minded, and occasionally resourceful, detective, and chases after leads with great enthusiasm, even when they lead him to the wrong conclusion.
 Sergeant Albright – Keith Osborn (2013–2014): played dogsbody to Inspectors Valentine and Sullivan.
 Sergeant Daniel Goodfellow – John Burton (2014–present): continued playing the dogsbody for the Inspector with increasing involvement. Credited in the opening beginning in series 5. Passed his exam to be an Inspector at the end of Series 10.
 Hercule Flambeau – John Light (2013–present): nemesis of Father Brown; jewel and art thief, seems to be without conscience. He and Father Brown have encountered each other at least once in every series; in series four he reveals he has a daughter, Marianne Delacroix, whom he had never met.
 Brenda Palmer – Ruby May-Martinwood (2022–present): a young woman who becomes the new housekeeper at St. Mary's. She made her first appearance in the Series 9 episode The Wayward Girls, before returning as a regular in Series 10.
 Mrs. Isabela Devine – Claudie Blakley (2023–present): a widowed mystery enthusiast who is Mrs. McCarthy's replacement as parish secretary.

Recurring roles
 Bishop Talbot – Malcolm Storry (2013–2015): he appeared in three episodes. Talbot is Father Brown's superior and doesn't like his sleuthing, but respects him for solving the mysteries. In The Daughter of Autolycus, his death was mentioned. He is succeeded by Bishop Reynard (Michael Pennington).
 Harold "Blind 'Arry" Slow – Alan Williams (2017–2020): he appeared in five episodes. Slow is the rag and bone man for Kembleford and also a drunk. In The Darkest Noon, he mentions that he got the nickname "Blind 'Arry" after being gassed in World War I, and he also mentions that he was a sapper. He wears several rows of medal ribbons and multiple loose medals, suggesting - if authentic - a distinguished previous military career.
 Professor Hilary Ambrose – James Laurenson (2014–2017): he appeared in two episodes. Ambrose is a theological scholar and friend of Father Brown.
 Canon Damien Fox – Roger May (2016–2022): he appeared in four episodes. He is a canon of the Diocese and reports to Bishop Reynard. Fox takes a dim view of Father Brown's unconventional ways.
 Katherine Corven – Kate O'Flynn (2017–2018): she appeared in two episodes. In The Eagle and the Daw, she was in prison for murdering her husband. Father Brown had helped to convict her and was awaiting her execution. In The Jackdaw's Revenge, she was cleared of the murder of her husband when someone else confessed: later in the episode she died from a gunshot.
 Daniel Whittaker – Daniel Flynn (2015–2018): he appeared in two episodes.  Whittaker is a ruthless MI5 agent who blackmails Lady Felicia. In The Man in the Shadows, he had Sid arrested on false charges after he entered an MI5 room. In The Face of the Enemy, he compelled Lady Felicia to steal (by substitution) a roll of film from one of her lovers, an alleged Soviet spy, and had her arrested on false charges. Father Brown persuaded him to let her go.
 Marianne Delacroix – Gina Bramhill (2016–2020). Flambeau's daughter is equally adept at theft. Two episodes.
 Gerald Firth/Kalon – Michael Maloney (2013–2022). Founder and leader of the cult-like Church of Apollo. Two episodes.

Cast

 Mark Williams as Father Brown
 Sorcha Cusack as Mrs. Bridgette McCarthy (Series 1–9)
 Nancy Carroll as Lady Felicia Montague (regular Series 1–4; recurring Series 5–present)
 Alex Price as Sid Carter (regular Series 1–4 & 9; recurring Series 5–6 & 8)
 Hugo Speer as Inspector Valentine (regular Series 1; guest Series 2 & 8)
 Keith Osborn as Sergeant Albright (Series 1–2)
 Kasia Koleczek as Susie Jasinski (Series 1)
 John Light as Hercule Flambeau (recurring Series 1–present)
 John Burton as Sergeant Goodfellow (Series 2–present)
 Tom Chambers as Inspector Sullivan (regular Series 2–3 & 10–present; guest Series 7–8)
 Jack Deam as Inspector Mallory (Series 4–9)
 Emer Kenny as Penelope "Bunty" Windermere (regular Series 5–8; recurring Series 9)
 Ruby-May Martinwood as Brenda Palmer (guest Series 9; regular Series 10–present)
 Claudie Blakley as Mrs. Isobel Devine (Series 10–present)

Notes
 In Series 9, only Mark Williams and John Burton appear in all episodes. Nancy Carroll (2 episodes), Sorcha Cusack (8 episodes), Jack Deam (9 episodes), Emer Kenny (2 episodes) and Alex Price (6 episodes) only receive main cast credits for the episodes in which they appear.
 Oliver Ford Davies is the only actor to appear in both the 1974 series and the 2013 series.
 Jo Stone-Fewings is the real-life husband of Nancy Carroll. The pair did not share any scenes in the 2016 episode "The Daughter of Autolycus".
 Niamh Cusack, who is the sister of Sorcha Cusack, played Mrs. McCarthy's sister Roisin in the 2020 episode "The Numbers of the Beast".

Conception
BBC Daytime wanted a home-grown detective series for the weekday afternoons on BBC One. Original ideas from writers were pitched, but the BBC wanted something that was less risky and already well known. Father Brown had not been filmed for British television since the 1970s with Kenneth More. Executive Producer John Yorke came up with the idea after hearing a radio documentary about G. K. Chesterton presented by Ann Widdecombe.

Writers were given the choice of adapting an existing story or coming up with an original idea. The Chesterton stories were set all over the world and at different times. Although half of the episodes in the first series were loosely based on the Chesterton stories, a decision was made to restrict the programme's location and date.

The Cotswolds was chosen because it had few modern buildings and was close to the production base in Birmingham. The 1950s were chosen because the detective could solve puzzles using his mind and knowledge of human nature instead of relying on modern technology. Despite this, the script sometimes includes anachronistic language (e.g., "secure the crime scene", "mojo"). The lead writers, Rachel Flowerday and Tahsin Guner, created the supporting characters. Other writers contributed stand-alone scripts that were not part of a story arc.

Production
The series is a BBC Studios Birmingham Drama Village production and filming for the first series of ten episodes of Father Brown began in the Cotswolds in summer 2012. The BBC renewed Father Brown for a second series of ten episodes in 2013. A third series of 15 episodes was commissioned in 2014. A fourth series of ten episodes was commissioned in 2015.

Filming

Filming takes place in the Gloucestershire village of Blockley using the Church of St Peter and St Paul, Blockley (Church of England) as the St Mary Roman Catholic church of the series and the vicarage transformed into the presbytery for Father Brown's residence. Other villages used are Winchcombe, Upper Slaughter, Kemerton and Guiting Power. Filming also took place at Winchcombe railway station and Toddington railway station on the heritage Gloucestershire Warwickshire Railway. Sudeley Castle was the main location for The Eye of Apollo. Princethorpe College, once a Catholic convent, now a secondary school, was used to film "St Agnes Convent" in Series One Episode 6.

Filming for the second series included the Warwickshire village of Ilmington. Chastleton House and Berkeley Castle were used to portray Pryde Castle in the episode broadcast on 8 January 2014. Kenilworth Castle in Warwickshire provided the location for the final resting place of the famed rosary in the episode Mysteries of the Rosary airing 10 January 2014. The gardens at Snowshill Manor featured in the same episode. The Time Machine episode, in series 3, was based around the Warwickshire estate of Alscot Park.

Filming has also taken place at Ashdown WW2 Camp, Evesham, Worcestershire where the TV series the Land Girls was also filmed. Laid out as a WW2 camp, Ashdown Camp is made up of 11 Nissen huts, air raid shelters, and outbuildings. Also used were the 1930s portion of Shire Hall, Warwick, headquarters of Warwickshire County Council, Bloxham School in Oxfordshire and Worcester Guildhall. The former hospital at Moreton-in-Marsh was used for the new police station and for Father Brown's kitchen, study and presbytery.

Locations

Episodes

Broadcast 
BBC Worldwide has sold Father Brown to 232 territories, including, Australia (ABC), Belgium (VRT), the Netherlands (KRO-NCRV), BBC First (Dutch TV channel), Spain (Paramount Network), Portugal (FOX Crime), Finland (YLE), Sweden (TV8), Denmark (DR), Norway (NRK), Estonia (ETV), Iceland (RÚV), Italy (Paramount Network), Croatia (HRT), and Brazil (TV Cultura). In the United States, Father Brown has been sold to 40 public television stations with a reach of 30% of all U.S. television households. The first four series were added to the Netflix streaming service on 31 March 2017. Series five and six were added later in 2019.

Spin offs 
In January 2020, it was announced that production had begun for a ten-episode series entitled Sister Boniface Mysteries for BritBox, the streaming service. Lorna Watson returns as Sister Boniface. She played the character in 2013 in the Father Brown episode, The Bride of Christ. It was confirmed this series would air in early 2022, with the ninth series of the parent. After debuting on BritBox, 'The Sister Boniface Mysteries' aired on Drama, with the DVD available from 16 May 2022.
The spin-off has been renewed for a second series.

Mark Williams guest stars, resuming his role of Father Brown in Series 1 episode 4.

Home media
The Region 2/Region B UK releases are published by Dazzler Media.

 Series 1 released in March 2014
 Series 2 released in June 2014
 Series 3 released in March 2015
 Series 4 released in March 2016
 Series 5 released in February 2017
 Series 6 released in February 2018
 Series 7 released in February 2019
 Series 8 released in March 2020
 Series 9 released in February 2022

The series has also been released on DVD (but not Blu-ray) in the U.S., Australia, the Netherlands, and Germany.

Since 2019, the series has been prominently featured on the Britbox streaming service in North America.

References

External links

 
 
 

2013 British television series debuts
2010s British drama television series
2010s British mystery television series
2020s British drama television series
2020s British mystery television series
2010s British comedy-drama television series
2020s British comedy-drama television series
Adaptations of works by G. K. Chesterton
BBC Daytime television series
BBC high definition shows
BBC television dramas
Television series about Christian religious leaders
English-language television shows
Catholic drama television series
Television series set in the 1950s
Television shows set in Gloucestershire
British detective television series
Television series by BBC Studios